= Alan Russell-Cowan =

British artist

- Born: 1970 (age 55–56); London
- Website: alanstreets.net

Alan Russell-Cowan aka Alan Streets is an English artist. He was born in London in 1970, his mother is German, his father English. He has been painting since the age of 8 and is primarily self-taught. Alan believes that his schizophrenia has been the passion and inspiration of his painting, and that his painting has been the stimulus for the suppression of his symptoms of schizophrenia. He paints obsessively and prolifically. He stars in the documentary My Name Is Alan and I Paint Pictures, which covers six years of his life and focuses on the relationship between his diagnosis of paranoid schizophrenia and his struggle to find success in the art world.

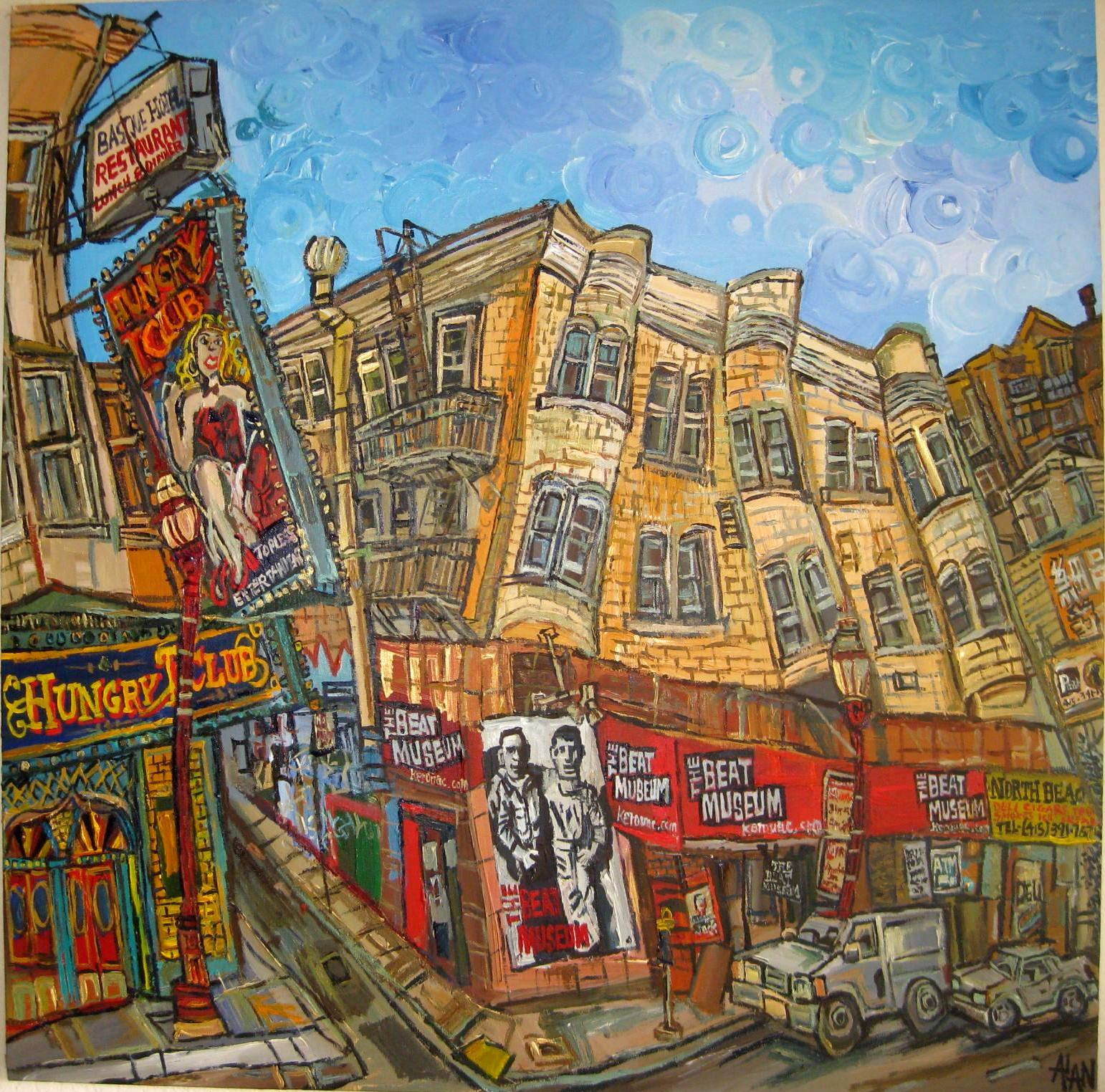
An Alan Streets painting of the Beat Museum in San Francisco, CA

He specializes in stylized landscapes of New York City, San Francisco, and other US cities along with his native England. He also paints imaginary visualizations of his perceived realities.
